Carol C. Cleven (November 2, 1928 – March 12, 2015) was an American Republican politician from Chelmsford, Massachusetts. She represented the 16th Middlesex district in the Massachusetts House of Representatives from 1987 to 2002.

See also
 1987-1988 Massachusetts legislature
 1989-1990 Massachusetts legislature
 1991-1992 Massachusetts legislature
 1993-1994 Massachusetts legislature
 1995-1996 Massachusetts legislature
 1997-1998 Massachusetts legislature
 1999-2000 Massachusetts legislature
 2001-2002 Massachusetts legislature

References

1928 births
2015 deaths
Members of the Massachusetts House of Representatives
Women state legislators in Massachusetts
20th-century American women politicians
20th-century American politicians
People from Chelmsford, Massachusetts
21st-century American women